Ludeman is a surname. Notable people with the surname include:

Cal Ludeman (born 1951), American politician
Keith Ludeman (born 1950), British businessman
Tim Ludeman (born 1987), Australian cricketer

Surnames of German origin